The Prada Female Discrimination Case was a lawsuit filed in Japan by former Prada employee Rina Bovrisse accusing Prada of sexual harassment and gender discrimination in the workplace. Prada denied all charges and countersued Bovrisse for defamation. In October 2012, Judge Reiko Morioka rejected all of Bovrisse's claims against Prada ruling that “the factual content of Bovrisse’s assertions that were based on gender discrimination and sexual harassment was not true and that there was no justifiable reason to believe such content to be true”. Bovrisse, not satisfied with the ruling, took the issue to United Nations Economic and Social Council. The Prada countersuit, as of January 1, 2014, is still pending.

Background 

Rina Bovrisse graduated from Parsons The New School for Design and, during her 18-year fashion career, worked at some of the world's largest luxury fashion companies including Chanel SA and Prada USA. She worked at offices in New York, London, Hawaii and Paris. Prada Japan hired Bovrisse, a Japanese national, in April 2009 as Senior Retail Operations Manager, responsible for overseeing 500 employees and 42 stores in Japan, Guam, and Saipan.

Litigation 
On December 10, 2009, Bovrisse filed a complaint against Prada before an industrial tribunal, alleging sexual harassment and discrimination against women, violating women's rights in the workplace. On March 12, 2010, the judge declared that the parties had failed to settle, which would permit formal litigation to commence.

On March 19, 2010, Bovrisse filed a civil suit against Prada alleging violations of women's rights. Prada countersued for damaging the company's image. The case was dismissed on October 26, 2012. Bovrisse, citing concerns of threats by the judge and suspicion of political intrigue, did not appeal this decision. Instead, she took her case to the United Nations. On April 30, 2013, the Office of the United Nations High Commissioner for Human Rights published a counter-report, and on May 17, 2013, the United Nations Economic and Social Council released a statement to the Government of Japan urging to introduce new regulations that would make sexual harassment in the workplace illegal.

On May 15, 2010, a former Prada manager filed a civil lawsuit against Prada alleging violations of women's rights.

References

Sexism